Václav Labík-Gregan (born 11 September 1893, date of death unknown) was a Czech sprinter. He competed in the men's 100 metres at the 1912 Summer Olympics representing Bohemia.

References

External links
 

1893 births
Year of death missing
People from Kutná Hora District
People from the Kingdom of Bohemia
Athletes (track and field) at the 1912 Summer Olympics
Czech male sprinters
Olympic athletes of Bohemia
Sportspeople from the Central Bohemian Region